IF Magazine, also known as Inside Film, IF: Australia's Filmmaker Magazine, and IF: The Magazine for Independent Filmmakers, is an Australian print and online trade publication for screen-content professionals in Australia and New Zealand.

The magazine was founded in 1997. In April 2012 the 150th issue was published.

It is a bi-monthly print magazine as well as a website. The magazine's content includes original research in specially commissioned articles that are unique.

Based in Sydney, the magazine's content comprises Australian film and television, distribution, exhibition, digital media, marketing, finance, and detailed analysis of and reporting on domestic screen production.

Inside Film is owned by The Intermedia Group. Jackie Keast is editor, while Don Groves has been senior journalist since 2013. Groves formerly worked with Variety in Sydney and London, and has contributed regularly to Deadline Hollywood and SBS Film.

The magazine is available online by subscription on Informit from Issue 41 (February 2002).

References

External links

1997 establishments in Australia
Business magazines published in Australia
Bi-monthly magazines published in Australia
Magazines established in 1997
Magazines published in Sydney
Professional and trade magazines
Film magazines published in Australia
Magazines about the media